Maycock is a surname. Notable people with the surname include:

Alfred Maycock (born 1949), former Guyanese cricketer
Anna Maycock (born 1982), captain of the Australia women's national volleyball team
Betty-Jean Maycock Harrington (born 1942), former Olympic gymnast from Cleveland, Ohio
Callum Maycock (born 1997), English footballer
Ellen Maycock (born 1950), American mathematician
Mary Dye née Maycock (born 1961), American politician of the Republican Party
Mike Mayock (born 1958), NFL Network analyst 
Pam Royds née Maycock (1924-2016), British publisher and children's book editor
Renae Maycock (born 1980), Australian volleyball player

See also
Maycock's Bay, Barbados
Mycock, a surname